Rochester Council may be:

 Rochester Council (Minnesota)
 Rochester Council (New York)